Yuanshi may refer to:

The Yuanshi era marks the period of the rule of Emperor Ping of Han
Yuanshi County (元氏县), Hebei, China
History of Yuan, also known as the Yuanshi, official Chinese historical work for the Yuan Dynasty
Yuanshi Tianzun, one of the highest deities of religious Taoism